Legorreta is a surname. Notable people with the surname include: 

César Armando Librado Legorreta (born 1981), Mexican serial killer, known as El Coqueta
Enriqueta Legorreta (1914–2010) Mexican opera singer and environmental activist
Jorge Legorreta (1948–2012), Mexican architect
Jorge Legorreta Ordorica (born 1970), Mexican politician
Pablo Legorreta, Mexican-American billionaire, founder of Royalty Pharma
Ricardo Legorreta (1931–2011), Mexican architect
Víctor Legorreta (born 1966), Mexican architect, son of Ricardo